This is a list of VHS and DVD releases for Mighty Morphin Power Rangers from regions 1, 2, and 4.

Region 1 (United States, Canada)

United States

VHS releases
Between 1994 and 1995, Saban Home Entertainment and WarnerVision Entertainment released 1 episode on VHS tapes. Each VHS consisted of their title named episodes. In 1996, Saban Home Entertainment released three compilation VHS tapes of "All Time Favorites". 20th Century Fox Home Entertainment also released compilation VHS tapes as well in 2000.

Spin-off VHS releases

Complete sets (DVD)
In March 2012, Shout! Factory obtained the rights to distribute the first 17 seasons of the Power Rangers series on DVD, beginning with Mighty Morphin Power Rangers. In July 2012, they first released the complete set at Comic-Con International in a 19 disc set of all three seasons of Mighty Mighty Morphin Power Rangers that included the 10 episode mini-series, Mighty Morphin Alien Rangers. In August of that same year, they released the first season of the series to Time Life bundled with a Red Ranger action figure, as well as the 19 disc complete set (minus the Comic-Con exclusive paper wrapper) bundled together with the 21 disc Power Rangers Seasons 4-7 set and Red Ranger action figure. In November 2012 they released the 19 disc complete set for a third time to wider retail along with eventual individual releases of both Season 1 and Season 2 (each season being split into two volumes). In July 2013, they released the entire third season on DVD without the Alien Rangers mini-series (which got its own separate release in September 2013). After working out a deal with Lionsgate for access to season 18 through 20, a limited edition 98 disc set entitled Power Rangers: Legacy, which consist of the complete first 20 seasons of the Power Rangers franchise including the three seasons from Mighty Morphin Power Rangers, was scheduled for a December 3, 2013 release, but due to manufacturing errors on the packaging the set was postponed and was instead released on January 2, 2014. In March 2015 they released a complete first season set exclusively to Wal-Mart that features an alternate cover from the Time Life complete first season set. The complete second season set was also released exclusively to Wal-Mart on the same day. In October 2016 they released a new version of the complete set featuring alternate cover art from the 2012 releases. In March 2017 they released a season one and two bundled set exclusively to Best Buy. In August 2018 a new version of the complete set released featuring a "25th Anniversary" Steelbook and included Mighty Morphin Power Rangers: The Movie on Blu-ray (the rest of the set is still DVD). In April 2019 a new version of the complete first season set is scheduled to release featuring a limited Steelbook. In June 2019 a new version of the complete second season set is scheduled to release featuring a limited Steelbook. In August 2019 a new version of the complete third season set is scheduled to release featuring a limited Steelbook and including the 10 episode mini-series, Mighty Morphin Alien Rangers.

Volume DVDs
In August 2012, Shout! Factory began releasing two volume sets of the first two seasons of Mighty Morphin Power Rangers. In September 2014 Shout! Factory released the "Green with Evil" saga from season 1 on a single volume. In February 2017 Shout! Factory released a "Best of Blue" DVD on a single volume featuring episodes where Billy the Blue Ranger is the main focus.

Compilation DVDs
In April 2003, Buena Vista Home Entertainment released a compilation DVD that consisted of 8 episodes, two from Mighty Morphin Power Rangers, two from Power Rangers in Space, one from Power Rangers Lost Galaxy, two from Power Rangers Lightspeed Rescue and the episode "Forever Red" from Power Rangers Wild Force. Starting in 2012, Lionsgate began releasing holiday DVDs based on the newer seasons of Power Rangers Samurai onward. To make these holiday DVDs a more worthwhile purchase for consumers Lionsgate worked out a deal with Shout! Factory to make these into 3 episode compilation DVDs by including extra episodes from seasons prior to Power Rangers Samurai, including episodes from Mighty Morphin Power Rangers.

Promotional "Day of the Dumpster" DVDs

In 2010, Buena Vista Home Entertainment (through Bandai of America) released a DVD that contained the episode "Day of the Dumpster" from the 2010 version of Mighty Morphin Power Rangers. It came bundled with select toys from the Mighty Morphin Power Rangers 2010 toy line. It was also later given out at New York Comic-Con by Saban Brands after their repurchase of the franchise. The New York Comic-Con version is slightly unique in that it features a sticker on the DVD advertising Power Rangers Samurai. To date this is the only episode from the 2010 version of Mighty Morphin Power Rangers to see a DVD release. In 2010, Saban Brands also released a DVD that contained the 1993 version of "Day of the Dumpster". Limited to only 5,000 copies, the DVD was only given out at San Diego Comic-Con and Power Morphicon.

Canada DVD release

Region 2 (UK, France, Germany)

UK VHS releases

German DVD releases

UK compilation DVD

France DVD releases

Region 4 (Australia)

DVD release

References

Home video releases
Mighty Morphin Power Rangers